Charles Hugh Alison (5 March 1883 – 20 October 1952) was a British golf course architect. He worked predominantly with Harry Colt, John Morrison, and Alister MacKenzie, in 1928 forming Colt, Alison & Morrison Ltd.

Life and career
Alison was born in Preston, Lancashire. He attended Malvern College in Worcestershire before going up to New College, Oxford, to study history, law and divinity. He represented the university at golf in 1903 and 1904, but did not finish his degree. He also played four first-class cricket matches for Somerset County Cricket Club between 1902 and 1905 and played Minor Counties cricket for Buckinghamshire in 1911 and 1912.

Alison served in both World War I and World War II decoding ciphers.

One of Alison's most-respected designs is Milwaukee Country Club (1929), co-designed with Colt, which was ranked among the Top 50 golf courses in America by Golf Digest in 2007. Another endearing Colt-Alison design is Century Country Club (1927) in Purchase, New York. The course's architects are listed as Colt and Alison but MacKenzie's influence is imbued throughout the 18 holes. He was one of the founding members of the International Society of Golf Architects in 1929.

On a trip to Japan in 1930 he laid down principles that guided Japanese golf course design throughout the 20th century.

Alison and his wife moved to South Africa in 1947. He worked on several South African golf courses before his death in Cape Town in 1952.

References

External links
Colt Association Official Site
 
 

1883 births
1952 deaths
People educated at Malvern College
Alumni of New College, Oxford
Sportspeople from Preston, Lancashire
Golf course architects
English cricketers
English male golfers
Buckinghamshire cricketers
Somerset cricketers
British military personnel of World War I
British military personnel of World War II
Military personnel from Preston, Lancashire